The Saturday Press was the name of a newspaper, established in 1927 by Jay M. Near and Howard A. Guilford, and published in Minneapolis, Minnesota. The newspaper was run by Jay Near, who was an allegedly anti-Semitic, anti-labor and anti-Communist small-time editor. Daniel B. Moskowitz describes it as having "traded in sensationalism, filling columns with a mishmash of pioneering exposes of public corruption and totally unsubstantiated calumny."

Floyd B. Olson, the future governor of Minnesota, brought a suit against Near and Guilford because their newspaper had an overly anti-Semitic tone, which Olsen claimed was a violation of the Public Nuisance Law, also known as the Minnesota Gag Law, of 1925. The scandal sheet published countless exposes until it was shut down in 1927 by the Gag Law.  In 1931, the historic U.S. Supreme Court case Near v. Minnesota struck the statute as unconstitutional.  Prior restraint laws have never fared well in courts since, including the case of the Pentagon Papers. The paper re-appeared from 1932 to 1936, when Jay Near died in relative obscurity.

References

External links
Text of Near v. Minnesota at Findlaw.

Defunct newspapers published in Minnesota